Floyd Township is one of twelve townships in Floyd County, Iowa, USA.  As of the 2000 census, its population was 1,032.

Geography
According to the United States Census Bureau, Floyd Township covers an area of 42.35 square miles (109.67 square kilometers).

Cities, towns, villages
 Floyd

Unincorporated towns
 Floyd Crossing at 
(This list is based on USGS data and may include former settlements.)

Adjacent townships
 West Lincoln Township, Mitchell County (north)
 Cedar Township (northeast)
 Niles Township (east)
 Saint Charles Township (southeast)
 Ulster Township (southwest)
 Rudd Township (west)
 Cedar Township, Mitchell County (northwest)

Cemeteries
The township contains Oakwood Cemetery.

Major highways
  U.S. Route 18
  U.S. Route 218

Landmarks
 Idlewild State Park

School districts
 Charles City Community School District
 Osage Community School District

Political districts
 Iowa's 4th congressional district
 State House District 14
 State Senate District 7

References
 United States Census Bureau 2008 TIGER/Line Shapefiles
 United States Board on Geographic Names (GNIS)
 United States National Atlas

External links
 US-Counties.com
 City-Data.com

Townships in Floyd County, Iowa
Townships in Iowa